Mićo Kuzmanović (born 18 March 1996) is a Bosnian professional footballer who plays as a winger for Tuzla City.

Club career

Early career
Born in Doboj, Kuzmanović moved to Zvijezda Gradačac from Modriča Maxima in the summer of 2013. After one season, he joined Serbian side Jagodina. After failing to secure a first-team spot in Jagodina, Kuzmanović moved back to Bosnia and Herzegovina, this time to Borac Banja Luka, with whom he signed in 2015. After just six months in Banja Luka, he switched clubs again and signed with Drina Zvornik.

In June 2016, he joined Mladost DK.

In May 2017, he signed a two-year deal with Sarajevo.

Mouscron
On 14 June 2018, Kuzmanović signed a three-year deal with Belgian side Mouscron on free transfer. He made his competitive debut for the club in a league loss to Oostende on 28 July. On 6 April 2019, he scored his first goal for the club against Cercle Brugge.

Rudar Velenje
On 2 September 2019, he joined Slovenian club Rudar Velenje on a two-year contract.

International career
Kuzmanović represented Bosnia and Herzegovina at various youth levels.

Career statistics

Club

Notes

References

External links

1996 births
Living people
People from Doboj
Serbs of Bosnia and Herzegovina
Association football wingers
Bosnia and Herzegovina footballers
Bosnia and Herzegovina youth international footballers
Bosnia and Herzegovina under-21 international footballers
FK Modriča players
NK Zvijezda Gradačac players
FK Jagodina players
FK Borac Banja Luka players
FK Drina Zvornik players
FK Mladost Doboj Kakanj players
FK Sarajevo players
Royal Excel Mouscron players
NK Rudar Velenje players
NK Celje players
FK Tuzla City players
Premier League of Bosnia and Herzegovina players
Serbian SuperLiga players
Belgian Pro League players
Slovenian PrvaLiga players
Bosnia and Herzegovina expatriate footballers
Expatriate footballers in Serbia
Expatriate footballers in Belgium
Expatriate footballers in Slovenia
Bosnia and Herzegovina expatriate sportspeople in Serbia
Bosnia and Herzegovina expatriate sportspeople in Belgium
Bosnia and Herzegovina expatriate sportspeople in Slovenia